Krivtsov (Russian: Кривцов) is a Russian masculine surname originating from the adjective krivoi, meaning bent; its feminine counterpart is Krivtsova. It may refer to
Dmytro Krivtsov (born 1985), Ukrainian road bicycle racer
Larisa Krivtsova (born 1949), Russian journalist, producer and media personality
Nikolay Krivtsov (1945–2011), was a Russian agricultural scientist
Sasha Krivtsov (born 1967), Russian bass guitar player 
Stefan Krivtsov (1885–1943), Russian historian and cultural activist 
Vladimir Krivtsov (born 1952), Russian swimmer 
Yuriy Krivtsov (born 1979), French road bicycle racer, brother of Dmytro

References

Russian-language surnames